Capreolia is a genus of red algae belonging to the family Gelidiaceae.

The species of this genus are found in Australia and New Zealand.

Species: Capreolia implexa Guiry & Womersley

References

Gelidiaceae
Red algae genera